The 44th Georgia Infantry Regiment was an infantry regiment in the Confederate States Army during the American Civil War.

History
The 44th Georgia Volunteer Infantry Regiment was entered into service in the Confederate States Army on March 11, 1862, at Camp Stephens near Griffin, Georgia. The regiment consisted of the following 10 companies:

 Company A- Weems' Guards, Henry County, Georgia
 Company B- Jasper Volunteers, Jasper County, Georgia
 Company C- Johnson Guards, Clarke County, Georgia
 Company D- Estes Guards, Clayton County, Georgia
 Company E- Freeman Volunteers, Spalding County, Georgia
 Company F- Putnam Volunteers, Putnam County, Georgia
 Company G- Huie Guards, Fayette County, Georgia
 Company H- The Pike County Volunteers, Pike County, Georgia
 Company I- Morgan and Henry Volunteers, Henry County and Morgan County, Georgia
 Company K- The Greene County Volunteers, Greene County, Georgia

Assignments
Walkers Brigade, Department of North Carolina (April - June 1862)
Ripley's Brigade, D. H. Hill's Division, Army of Northern Virginia (June - September 1862)
Ripley's-Doles'-Cook's Brigade, D. H. Hill's_Rodes' Division, 2nd Corps, Army of Northern Virginia (September 1862 - June 1864)
Cook's Brigade, Rodes'-Grimes' Division, Valley District, Department of Northern Virginia (June - December 1864)
Cook's Brigade, Grimes' Division, 2nd Corps, Army of Northern Virginia (December 1864 - April 1865)

Commanding officers
Col. Robert A. Smith
Col. John B. Estes
Col. Samuel P. Lumpkin
Col. William H. Peebles
Cpt. Thomas R. Daniel
Cpt. John Tucker (detached from the 21st Georgia Infantry Regiment)

See also 
List of Civil War regiments from Georgia

References

Bibliography
 Crute Jr., Joseph H., Units of the Confederate States Army, Derwent Books, 1987.
 Thomas, Henry, History of Doles-Cook Brigade, 1903, Reprinted by Morningside Books, 1988.

Units and formations of the Confederate States Army from Georgia (U.S. state)
1862 establishments in Georgia (U.S. state)